Ganalo Peak is a subsidiary peak of Nanga Parbat in Pakistan's western Himalayas. Anchoring the rock and ice battlements northwest of Nanga Parbat's main summit, Ganalo rises 9,000 feet above the Rakhiot Glacier and 8,000 feet above the nearby Rakhiot Base Camp. The remote village of Beyal rests at its northern base. Ganalo Peak is easily viewed from Fairy Meadows, a popular trekking destination high above the Indus River.

Mountains of Gilgit-Baltistan
Six-thousanders of the Himalayas